F. Ryan Duffy (1888–1979) was a U.S. Senator from Wisconsin from 1933 to 1939. Senator Duffy may also refer to:

Dan Duffy (born 1966), Illinois State Senate
Francis Clyde Duffy (1890–1977), North Dakota State Senate
Thomas A. Duffy (1906–1979), New York State Senate